The Stone of Tmutarakan is a marble slab engraved with the words "In the year 6576 [ A.M., 1068 A.D] the sixth of the Indiction, Prince Gleb measured across the sea on the ice from Tmutarakan to Kerch 14,000 sazhen" («В лето 6576 индикта 6 Глеб князь мерил море по леду от Тмутороканя до Корчева 14000 сажен»).

A sazhen, an old Rus unit of length, was equal to seven feet (or corresponded roughly to a fathom); thus the Kerch Straits, according to the stone, were 88,000 feet or 18.5 miles across (that is, from Kerch to Tmutarakan — the straits themselves are only 4.5 miles wide at their narrowest point, but the distance from the site of Tmutarakan to modern-day Kerch is about 15 miles.)  The tenth-century Byzantine Emperor Constantine Porphyrogenitus wrote that the straits were the equivalent of 18 miles across, and this might explain why that measurement appears on the stone, although it is unclear if an eleventh-century prince in Rus would have had access to that information; this uncertainty calls the stone's authenticity into question.

The Prince Gleb referred to in the inscription was Gleb Svyatoslavich, then prince of Tmutarakan.  Gleb was later Prince of Novgorod the Great, where he saved Bishop Fedor's life by chopping a sorcerer in half who led a pagan uprising against the bishop.  Gleb was eventually killed fighting pagan Finnic tribes in the northern Novgorodian Lands ("the Zavoloch'e" or "Za Volokom", "the Land beyond the Portages") on May 30, 1079.

The stone was discovered on the Taman Peninsula just east of Crimea in 1792 and the inscription was first published in 1794 by Aleksei Musin-Pushkin.  The study of the inscription is said to be the first epigraphic study in Russian history.   In spite of its importance in the history of Russian epigraphy, a number of scholars have called the stone's provenance into question and consider the stone an eighteenth-century forgery, perhaps done by Romanticists enamored of ancient culture or even as an effort to find precedent for Russian involvement in the Caucasus.  The stone is currently housed in the State Hermitage Museum in Saint Petersburg.

References 

11th-century inscriptions
1792 archaeological discoveries
Archaeological discoveries in Russia
Forgery controversies
Kievan Rus'
Archaeological collections of the Hermitage Museum
Stones
Tmutarakan